Hamza Dursun (born 11 February 1994) is a Turkish cross-country skier. He competed in the 2018 Winter Olympics. 

Hamza was born in the Ağrı province of Turkey. His hobbies include fishing, swimming and basketball.

References

1994 births
Living people
Cross-country skiers at the 2018 Winter Olympics
Turkish male cross-country skiers
Olympic cross-country skiers of Turkey
Cross-country skiers at the 2012 Winter Youth Olympics
21st-century Turkish people